On November 14, 2008, three people were fatally shot at the office of SiPort, a start-up company in Santa Clara, California. Jing Hua Wu was arrested and convicted.

Shooting 
SiPort CEO Sid Agrawal, human resources manager Marilyn Lewis, and vice president of operations Brian Pugh were all shot fatally in the head. It was one of the deadliest workplace killings in Silicon Valley history.

Perpetrator
Wu (born 1961–62) was born in China, and was a former employee of SiPort. He was distraught over losing his job at the company.

Legal proceedings 
Jing Hua Wu was charged with three counts of first-degree murder and special circumstances of using a firearm, and was represented by high-profile defense attorney Tony Serra. On March 8, 2013, Wu was found guilty of all charges. On August 2, 2013, Wu was sentenced to life imprisonment without the possibility of parole, and an additional 75 years.

See also
 List of homicides in California

References

External links 

 The People v. Jing Hua Wu

2008 in California
2008 murders in the United States
Deaths by firearm in California
History of Santa Clara, California
Murder in California
Murder in the San Francisco Bay Area
November 2008 events in the United States
Workplace violence in the United States